Marc Lépine  (born October 26, 1964 – December 6, 1989) was a Canadian antifeminist mass murderer from Montreal, Quebec, who, in 1989, murdered fourteen women, and wounded ten women and four men at the École Polytechnique de Montréal, an engineering school affiliated with the Université de Montréal, in the École Polytechnique massacre.

Lépine was born in Montreal, the son of Canadian nurse Monique Lépine and Algerian businessman Rachid Gharbi. Gharbi was abusive towards and contemptuous of women, and left the relationship after Monique returned to nursing to support her children; Lépine was seven at the time. Lépine and his younger sister lived with other families, seeing their mother on weekends. Lépine was considered bright but withdrawn, and had difficulties with peer and family relationships. He legally changed his name at the age of 14 giving "hatred of his father" as the reason.

Lépine's application to the Canadian Forces was rejected, and in 1982 he began a science program at a college, switching to a more technical program after one year. In 1986 he dropped out of the course in his final term, and was subsequently fired from his job at a hospital due to his poor attitude. Lépine began a computer programming course in 1988, and again abandoned it before completion. He twice applied for admission to the École Polytechnique, but lacked two required compulsory courses. 

Lépine had long complained about women working in "non-traditional" jobs. After several months of planning, including the purchase of a semi-automatic rifle, he entered the École Polytechnique on the afternoon of December 6, 1989, separated the men from the women in a classroom, and shot the women, while yelling, "I hate feminists", claiming that he was "fighting feminism". He then moved into other parts of the building, targeting only the women, before killing himself. His suicide note blamed feminists for ruining his life.

Lépine's actions have been variously ascribed from a psychiatry perspective with diagnoses such as personality disorder, psychosis, or attachment disorder, noting societal factors such as poverty, isolation, powerlessness, and violence in the media. The massacre is regarded by criminologists as an example of a hate crime against women, and by feminists and government officials as a misogynist attack and an example of the larger issue of violence against women. December 6 is now observed in Canada as a National Day of Remembrance and Action on Violence Against Women.

Life

Childhood
Marc Lépine was born Gamil Rodrigue Liass Gharbi on October 26, 1964, in Montreal, Quebec, the son of Algerian immigrant Rachid Liass Gharbi and Canadian nurse Monique Lépine. Gamil's sister, Nadia, was born in 1967. Rachid was a mutual funds salesman and was travelling in the Caribbean at the time of his son's birth. During his absence, Monique discovered evidence that her husband had been having an affair. Rachid was a non-practising Muslim, and Monique a former Catholic nun who had rejected organized religion after she left the convent. Their son was baptized a Catholic as an infant, but received no religious instruction during his childhood; his mother described her son as "a confirmed atheist all his life". 

Instability and violence marked the family: they moved frequently, and much of young Lépine's early childhood was spent in Costa Rica and Puerto Rico, where his father worked for a Swiss mutual funds company. The family returned to Montreal permanently in 1968, shortly before a stock market crash led to the loss of much of the family's assets. Rachid was an authoritarian, possessive and jealous man, frequently violent towards his wife and children. He had contempt for women and believed that they were intended only to serve men. He required his wife to act as his personal secretary, slapping her if she made any errors in typing, and forcing her to retype documents in spite of the cries of their toddler. He was also neglectful and abusive towards his children, particularly his son, and discouraged any tenderness as he considered it spoiling.

In 1970, following an incident in which Rachid struck Gamil so hard that the marks on his face were visible a week later, Monique decided to leave. The legal separation was finalized in 1971, and the divorce in 1976. Following the separation, Gamil lived with his mother and younger sister Nadia; soon after, their home and possessions were seized when Rachid defaulted on mortgage payments. Gamil was afraid of his father, and at first saw him on weekly supervised visits. The visits ended quickly, as Rachid ceased contact with his children soon after the separation. Gamil never saw his father again, and in the future refused to discuss him with others.

Rachid stopped making child support payments after paying them twice, and to make ends meet Monique returned to nursing. She subsequently started taking further courses to advance her career. During this time the children lived with other families during the week, seeing their mother only on weekends. Concerned about her children and parenting skills, she sought help for the family from a psychiatrist at St. Justine's Hospital in 1976; the assessment concluded there was nothing wrong with the shy and withdrawn Gamil, but recommended therapy for his sister Nadia, who was challenging Monique's authority. Nadia died in 1996 at the age of 28 from a drug overdose of cocaine.

Adolescence
After the divorce became final in 1976, the Lépine children, then aged 12 and 9, returned to live with their mother, who was director of nursing at a Montreal hospital. In 1977 the family moved to a house purchased in the middle-class Montreal suburb of Pierrefonds. Gamil attended junior high and high school, where he was described as a quiet student who obtained average to above average marks. He developed a close friendship with another boy, but he did not fit in with other students. Taunted as an Arab because of his name, at the age of 14 he legally changed it to "Marc Lépine", citing his hatred of his father as the reason for taking his mother's surname. Lépine was uncommunicative and showed little emotion. He suffered from low self-esteem, exacerbated by his chronic acne. Family relations remained difficult; his younger sister Nadia publicly humiliated him about his acne and his lack of girlfriends. Lépine fantasized about her death, and on one occasion made a mock grave for her. He was overjoyed when in 1981 she was placed in a group home because of her delinquent behaviour and drug abuse.

Seeking a good male role model for Lépine, his mother arranged for a Big Brother. For two years, the experience proved positive as Lépine, often with his best friend, enjoyed the time with photography and moto-cross motorcycles. However, in 1979, the meetings ceased abruptly when the Big Brother was detained on suspicion of molesting young boys. Both Lépine and his Big Brother denied that any molestation had occurred. Lépine owned an air rifle as a teenager, which he used to shoot pigeons near his home with his friend. They also enjoyed designing and building electronic gadgets. Lépine developed an interest in World War II and an admiration of Adolf Hitler, and enjoyed action and horror movies. He also took considerable responsibility at home, including cleaning and doing repairs while his mother worked.

Lépine applied to join the Canadian Forces as an officer cadet in September 1981 at the age of 17, but was rejected during the interview process. He later told his friend it was because of difficulties accepting authority, and in his suicide letter noted that he had been found to be "anti-social". An official statement from the military after the massacre stated that he had been "interviewed, assessed and determined to be unsuitable".

Adulthood
In 1982, at the age of 18, the Lépine family moved to Saint-Laurent, closer to his mother's work and to Lépine's new CEGEP. He lost contact with his school friend soon after the move. This period marks the beginning of the seven years which he described in his suicide note as having "brought [him] no joy".

In August 1982 Lépine began a two-year pre-university course in pure sciences at Cégep de Saint-Laurent, failing two courses in the first semester but improving his grades considerably in the second semester. He worked part-time at the hospital where his mother worked, serving food and doing custodial duties. Lépine was seen as nervous, hyperactive, and immature by his colleagues. He developed an attraction to another employee, but he was too shy to act on his feelings. After a year at college, he switched from the university-destined science program into electronics technology, a three-year technical program geared more towards immediate employment. His teachers remembered him as being a model student, quiet, hardworking, and generally doing well in his classes, particularly those related to electrotechnology. There was an unexplained drop in his marks in the fall 1985 term and in February 1986, during the last term of the program, he suddenly and without explanation stopped attending classes, as a result failing to complete his diploma.

Lépine moved out of his mother's home into his own apartment, and in 1986 he applied to study engineering at École Polytechnique de Montréal. He was admitted on the condition that he complete two compulsory courses, including one in solution chemistry. In 1987, Lépine was fired from his job at the hospital for aggressive behaviour, as well as disrespect of his superiors and carelessness in his work. He was enraged at his dismissal, and at the time described a plan to commit a murderous rampage and then commit suicide. Lépine's friends noted that he became unpredictable, flying into rages when frustrated.

In the fall of 1987, in order to complete his college diploma, Lépine took three courses, obtaining good marks in all of them, and in February 1988 began a course in computer programming at a private college in downtown Montreal, funding his studies with government student loans. He moved into a downtown apartment with his old high school friend, and in the winter of 1989 took a CEGEP night course in solution chemistry, a prerequisite course for the École Polytechnique. Lépine wanted a girlfriend, but was generally ill at ease around women. He tended to boss women around and show off his knowledge in front of them. He spoke out to men about his dislike of feminists, career women and women in traditionally male occupations, such as the police force, stating that women should remain in the home caring for their families. Lépine applied again to the École Polytechnique in 1989; however his application was rejected as he lacked required courses. In March 1989 he abandoned the course in computer programming, though he performed well in the CEGEP course, obtaining 100% in his final exam. In April 1989 he met with a university admissions officer and complained about how women were taking over the job market from men.

Massacre

The massacre appeared to have been planned for several months. In August 1989 Lépine picked up an application for a firearms-acquisition certificate, and in mid-October he received his permit. On November 21, 1989, he purchased a Ruger Mini-14 semi-automatic rifle at a local sporting goods store. Between October and December 1989 he was seen at least seven times at the École Polytechnique. Four days before the shooting, Lépine brought his mother a present, though it was several weeks before her birthday; he also brought a note and two bags of belongings, which she did not discover until long after the shooting. Lépine had previously always been very punctual paying his rent, but had not done so in December 1989.

On December 6, 1989, Lépine walked into the École Polytechnique. There, he entered a second-floor classroom where he separated the men and women and then ordered the approximately fifty men to leave. Claiming that he was fighting feminism, he shot the nine women who remained, killing six and injuring the rest. After this, Lépine moved to other areas of the building, including the cafeteria, corridors and another classroom. A total of fourteen women (twelve engineering students, one nursing student, and one university employee) were killed, and four men and ten women injured before Lépine turned the gun on himself. The event was later described as a "pseudo-community" type of "pseudo-commando" murder-suicide, in which the perpetrator targets a specific group, usually in a public place and intending to die in "a blaze of glory".

A three-page suicide letter was found in the pocket of Lépine's jacket. The letter was never officially made public, but was leaked in November 1990 to Francine Pelletier and published in the newspaper La Presse. In his letter, Lépine claimed political motives, blamed feminists for ruining his life, and expressed admiration for Denis Lortie, who had mounted an attack on the Quebec National Assembly in 1984 for political reasons, killing three Quebec government employees. The letter also contained a list of nineteen Quebec women whom Lépine apparently wished to kill because of their feminism. Another letter, written to a friend, promised the explanation to the massacre lay by following clues left in Lépine's apartment. The hunt led only to a suitcase of computer games and hardware.

Lépine was buried in the Cimetière Notre-Dame-des-Neiges in Montreal, a few blocks from where he committed the massacre.

Rationale
A police psychiatrist who interviewed Lépine's family and entourage, and who had access to his letters, suggested that he may have had a serious personality disorder, as he chose the multiple homicide/suicide strategy (killing oneself after killing others) that is a characteristic of this disorder. The psychiatrist noted "extreme narcissistic vulnerability" as shown by fantasies of power and success combined with high levels of self-criticism and difficulties dealing with rejection and failure. Feelings of powerlessness and incompetence were compensated for by a violent and grandiose imaginary life. Other psychiatrists suggested that Lépine was psychotic, having lost touch with reality as he tried to erase the memories of a brutal and absent father, while at the same time unconsciously identifying with a violent manhood that dominates women. Other theories were that Lépine's experiences of abuse as a child had caused brain damage or led him to feel victimized as he faced losses and rejections in his later life.

Lépine's mother speculated that he may have suffered from attachment disorder due to the abuse and sense of abandonment he had experienced in his childhood. She also wondered whether Lépine viewed her as a feminist, and that the massacre might have been an unconscious attempt to get revenge for her neglect while she pursued her career and for his sister's taunts. Others take a less individualistic approach. Many feminists and governmental officials view it as an illustration of misogynistic violence against women. Criminologists consider the massacre as an example of a hate or bias crime against women. A few antifeminists have sought to rehabilitate Lépine as hero of the antifeminist cause. Others wondered if Lépine's actions were the result of societal changes that had led to increased poverty, powerlessness, individual isolation or increased violence in the media and in society.

Suicide statement

The following is a translation of the suicide letter written by Lépine on the day of the shooting.
The original letter in French is also available.

The letter is followed by the list of nineteen names, with a note at the bottom:

Memorial
Canadians mark the day of the killings with a National Day of Remembrance and Action on Violence Against Women. In 2008, Monique Lépine published Aftermath, a memoir of her own journey through the grief and pain of the incident. She had stayed silent until 2006, when she decided to speak out for the first time in the wake of that year's Dawson College shooting.

In popular culture
Lépine's life and death was dramatized by Adam Kelly in his controversial play The Anorak.

Lépine was portrayed by Maxim Gaudette in the 2009 film Polytechnique, although the film never refers to Lépine by name. Gaudette won a Genie Award for Best Supporting Actor for his portrayal of Lépine.

Notes

References

Sources

External links
CBC Archives on the Montreal Massacre
Article about Lépine on Crimelibrary.com

1964 births
1989 deaths
1989 in Quebec
1989 murders in Canada
1989 suicides
20th-century Canadian criminals
Burials at Notre Dame des Neiges Cemetery
Canadian atheists
Canadian male criminals
Canadian mass murderers
Canadian people of Algerian-Berber descent
Canadian people of Algerian descent
Crime in Montreal
Criminals from Montreal
Deaths by firearm in Quebec
French Quebecers
Male critics of feminism
Male murderers
Murder in Canada
Murder in Quebec
Murder–suicides in Canada
Quebec murderers
Suicides by firearm in Quebec
Violence against women in Canada